Frequently referred to as The Green Book due to its green cover, the Uniform Crime Reporting Handbook is a publication of the United States Department of Justice and the Federal Bureau of Investigation.  The manual instructs law enforcement officers on the proper method for filling out the monthly Uniform Crime Reports returns for police records and statistics.

History
The Committee on Uniform Crime Records, established by the International Association of Chiefs of Police (IACP) in 1927, published the first version of the manual in 1929.  At that time, the manual defined Part I and Part II offenses and well as the Return A – Monthly Return of Offenses Known to the Police.  The most recent revision of the manual was published in 2004.

Chapters
 Introduction  A history of the UCR program and details on other state-run programs
 General Information  Definitions, details on the Hierarchy Rule for offenses and details on the Separation of Time and Place Rule
 Classifying Offenses  Rules for classifying the Part I offenses (see Uniform Crime Reports for information on Part I offenses)
 Scoring Offenses  Rules for scoring the Part I offenses on the Return A form
 Monthly Reporting Forms and Their Preparation  A detailed look at each of the nine monthly UCR reports
 Other UCR Program Forms  Information on optional UCR supplies, such as the tally book and daily log book
 Part II Offenses  Details on Part II offenses (see Uniform Crime Reports for information on Part II offenses)

External links
 Uniform Crime Reporting Handbook (FBI)

United States Department of Justice publications
Criminology handbooks and manuals